HowToBasic is an Australian YouTube comedy channel  with over 17 million subscribers. The creator of the videos does not speak or show his face, and remains anonymous. The channel primarily features bizarre and destructive visual gags disguised as how-to tutorials. The channel first gained popularity in 2013.

, HowToBasic is the 5th biggest Australian YouTube channel. The channel's estimated net worth is US$2 million .

The channel was briefly suspended on two occasions: once in 2014 and again in late 2015 on presumed violations of YouTube's policy on misleading content. Soon after each time, the channel was restored, and suspension lifted.

Description and history
The channel intentionally clickbaits first-time viewers to believe it is a how-to channel, with video titles, thumbnails, descriptions, as well as the channel's general description, claiming its videos to be tutorials on different subjects, with a particular emphasis on cooking. The actual content of the videos, instead, shows the unidentified man interacting in point of view with food and objects in many ways, mostly by throwing, destroying, and creating a large mess out of them. Some videos have employed additional gags, with guest actors and related footage appearing. Originally, the videos were genuine tutorials of very simple actions, such as "How to pick up an umbrella" (his first video) or "How to pour Drinks".

A common theme in the videos is that a large assortment of chicken eggs are thrown and destroyed. Many of the videos include a running gag in which the man gives a thumbs-up (or sometimes the finger gun or the middle finger) in front of the camera while pointing the camera at the mess created, often grunting affirmatively. This is typically just before the scene ends.

On 24 March 2018, HowToBasic released what appeared to be a face reveal video. However, the video turned out to be a parody and a compilation of popular YouTubers claiming themselves to be the creator of the channel, ultimately continuing the legitimate creator's anonymity. Over 80 individuals had a cameo in the video, including Michael Stevens of Vsauce, Markiplier, Casey Neistat, Daym Drops, h3h3productions, jacksfilms, Andy Milonakis, iDubbbz, Boogie2988, JonTron, Maxmoefoe, Jacksepticeye, RoomieOfficial, Aunty Donna, and Post Malone.

On April Fools Day 2018, the channel posted a genuine how-to cookery video, where the subject attempts to make a vegan curry while resisting his temptation for eggs and meat products. In following years, the channel has continued the trend by posting a cookery video on April Fools Day with the food and cooking process filmed in real-time (with a clock visible in shot), before being destroyed. This started in 2019 with "How To Make The Perfect Roast", where he prepares and cooks a roast joint for an hour before throwing it on the floor. This was repeated in 2020 with the three-hour long "How To Make Pulled Pork", and in 2021 with "How To Make a Slow Cooked Beef Stew", which ran for over eight hours. A 2022 iteration of this was never posted to the channel.

Popular culture
In June 2013, the man behind HowToBasic was interviewed as part of a 6:00 PM Australian News Bulletin by Nine News Perth, broadcast on STW. The station preserved his anonymity upon his request.

See also
 List of YouTubers

References

External links

Black comedy
Fullscreen (company) channels
Unidentified people
Surreal comedy
YouTube channels launched in 2011
Australian YouTubers
Comedy-related YouTube channels
Internet memes introduced in 2011
Internet memes